The Tour of Norway was a multi-day road bicycle race held in Norway between 1983 and 1992, with the exception of 1986 to 1989.

Winners

References

Cycle races in Norway
Defunct cycling races
Recurring sporting events established in 1983
Recurring sporting events disestablished in 1992